Debbie Young (born 1960) is a British writer of cozy mystery novels, UK ambassador for ALLi the (Alliance of Independent Authors), and founder in 2015 of the now annual Hawkesbury Upton Literary Festival. Her debut novel, Best Murder in Show, was published in 2017 as the first part in a series of seven novels that spans the course of a village year.

In 2015, Young commissioned T E Shepherd to illustrate the fictional Hector's House Bookshop and Tea Room that features in her Sophie Sayers Village Mysteries series of cozy mystery novels.

In 2018 Debbie was invited by John Holland to co-judge the Stroud Short Stories competition.

Biography 
Young was born in Sidcup, Kent, England, and was schooled first at Days Lane Primary, and then after passing the 11+ at Beaverwood School for Girls. Her family relocated to Germany when Debbie was aged 14, and she spent four years at Frankfurt International School where she gained the then brand new International Baccalaureate. Young came back to the UK to study English and Related Literature at the University of York, before living and working for a while in London and the West of England as a journalist and PR consultant. Young now lives in a small Cotswold village with her husband and daughter.

Works and Appearances

Sophie Sayers Village Mystery Novels
 Best Murder in Show (Sophie Sayers Village Mystery #1), Hawkesbury Press, 2017
 Trick or Murder? (Sophie Sayers Village Mystery #2), Hawkesbury Press, 2017
 Murder in the Manger (Sophie Sayers Village Mystery #3), Hawkesbury Press, 2017
 Murder by the Book (Sophie Sayers Village Mystery #4), Hawkesbury Press, 2018
 Springtime for Murder (Sophie Sayers Village Mystery #5), Hawkesbury Press, 2018

Staffroom at St Bride's
 Secrets at St Bride's (Staffroom at St Bride's #1), Hawkesbury Press, 2019

Books for Authors
 How To Get Your Self-Published Book into Bookstores: Volume 4 (with Orna Ross), Font Publications, 2017
 How to Work More Effectively with the Book Trade with Dan Holloway, Font Publications

Books about Type 1 Diabetes
 Coming to Terms with Type 1 Diabetes: One Family's Story of Life After Diagnosis (Foreword by Justin Webb), Hawkesbury Press, 2014

Collected Columns and Essays
Since 2010 Young has written monthly columns for two local magazines, the multiple award-winning "Tetbury Advertiser" and the "Hawkesbury Parish News". These articles and columns have since been republished in two books.
 All Part of the Charm: A Modern Memoir of English Village Life: Volume 1 (Collected Essays), Hawkesbury Press, 2016
 Young By Name: Whimsical Columns from the Tetbury Advertiser (Collected Essays), Hawkesbury Press, 2016

Articles and Interviews
 Young By Name: monthly contribution to the Tetbury Advertiser. Page 4 of the October edition
 Cozy Mystery Writer Debbie Young Gives Back to the Indie Community, Inspirational Indie Authors podcast with Howard Lovy, 8 September 2019
 Getting Your Self-Published Book Into Bookstores And Libraries With Debbie Young, interview with Joanna Penn
 Writing 1000 Words a Day: Finding Better Ways to Measure Productivity & Finish Your Book
 Are You A Plotter vs Pantser? With Debbie Young and David Penny
 Interview on Stratford Words with Nick le Mesurier

Hawkesbury Upton Literary Festival
Young has for many years been involved in the UNESCO-led World Book Night as one of thousands of volunteer "book givers". In 2015, she set up a small local event on the evening of 23 April (World Book Night) in The Fox Inn in Hawkesbury Upton. What started as a few author friends and village locals soon led to an invitation to the general public to join a full evening event with over 20 authors, poets and illustrators, celebrating the joy of reading with a series of panel discussions and public readings.

In 2016, the festival returned, this time for a full day's programme in multiple venues, and it has grown year on year since then. The fifth festival on Saturday 27 April 2019, once again coincided with World Book Night

References

External links 
 Official Web Page of Debbie Young 
 Debbie Young on Twitter
 Debbie Young Author at Facebook
 Debbie Young at Goodreads
 Debbie Young at Amazon
 Profile on Hawkesbury Press website

1961 births
People from Sidcup
Living people
20th-century British women writers
21st-century English novelists
21st-century British women writers
Alumni of the University of York